Sir John Godsalve (c. 1505 – 20 November 1556) of London and Norwich, Norfolk, was an English politician.

John Godsalve was a Clerk of the Signet and elected a Member of Parliament (MP) for Norwich in 1539 and ?1542. Godsalve was employed to carry bills from the Lords to the Commons in the Parliaments of 1542, 1545, 1547 and 1555, comptroller of the Tower Mint, credited with the design of the coins issued in September 1554.

Godsalve's first wife was Agnes Widmerpole, with whom he had two sons, William (c. 1530–1561) and Thomas (died 1587). In 1536, Godsalve and his wife Agnes had portraits painted by Hans Holbein the Younger. Godsalve's second wife was Elizabeth White, daughter of Henry White.

References

External links
Will of Sir John Godsalve, National Archives Retrieved 22 March 2013

Year of birth uncertain
1500s births
1556 deaths
Politicians from Norwich
Politicians from London
English knights
English MPs 1539–1540
English MPs 1542–1544